Rhine Creek is a stream in the U.S. state of Iowa. It is a tributary to Clear Creek.

Rhine Creek was so named on account of heavy German settlement near its course.

References

Rivers of Johnson County, Iowa
Rivers of Iowa County, Iowa
Rivers of Iowa